Kidfresh is a brand of meals for children.

Products 
Kidfresh meals are made with natural ingredients and contain no artificial colours, flavours or preservatives.  They contain up to one serving of vegetables and are rich in key nutrients  such as protein, calcium, fiber, vitamins and iron for growing kids. Kidfresh meals are low in sodium, fat, saturated fats, 0g trans fat, and contains less than 400 calories.

Available Kidfresh frozen meals:
 Totally Twisted Pasta + Meatballs
 Rainbow Rice + Chicken
 Easy Cheesy Ravioli
 Spaghetti Loops Bolognese
 Muy Cheesy Quesadillas
 Wagon Wheels Mac + Cheese

Environment 
Packaging contains no bisphenol A or phthalate and uses recycled paper, carbon-neutral printing and recyclable containers.

History 
Kidfresh was launched in 2007 and first started with a concept Kidfresh store in New York City where they offered natural and organic kids’ foods, including their own, freshly prepared in their “kidchen”.
The Kidfresh store attracted celebrities including Jennifer Garner, Tom Cruise and a lot of media interest from all around the world including The New York Times, USA Today, ABC News, CBS News, NBC News, Today Show, Nikkei (Japan), Elle Japan, France2 (France), Time Out Chicago (USA).
In 2009, Kidfresh's meals were first sold in America.

Availability 
Kidfresh is now distributed in the North East and Southern region, including Whole Foods, Shaws, and ShopRite.

Charity 
Kidfresh  is a sponsor of Save the Children,.

References

External links
Kidfresh official site

American brands
Food and drink companies based in New York (state)
Frozen food brands
Baby food manufacturers
American companies established in 2007